The 2021 Iraqi Super Cup was the 10th edition of the Iraqi Super Cup. It was held on 17 September 2021 between the 2020–21 Iraqi Premier League champions and FA Cup winners Al-Quwa Al-Jawiya and the league's runners-up Al-Zawraa. This was Al-Quwa Al-Jawiya's sixth Super Cup appearance overall while Al-Zawraa extended their record to eight appearances. Al-Zawraa won the match 1–0 with a goal from Mazin Fayyadh to clinch a record fifth Super Cup title.

Match

Details

Notes

References

External links
 Iraq Football Association

Football competitions in Iraq
Iraqi Super Cup
Iraq
2021–22 in Iraqi football